Krisztina Szádvári (born 31 October 1990) is a Hungarian handballer who plays for Gödi SE in left wing position.

Achievements

Nemzeti Bajnokság I:
Silver Medalist: 2008, 2009, 2012
Bronze Medalist: 2011
Magyar Kupa:
Silver Medalist: 2008, 2010
EHF Cup Winners' Cup:
Winner: 2011, 2012

References

External links

 Krisztina Szádvári career statistics at Worldhandball

1990 births
Living people
Hungarian female handball players